Michael Adebayo Olayinka (born 23 September 1999), popularly known as Ruger, is a Nigerian Afrobeat singer and songwriter. Ruger   signed a record deal in 2021 with D'Prince "Jonzing World record" for a publishing and distribution deal with Columbia Records, and Sony Music Entertainment, U.K division. On 4 March 2021, he released his debut EP  Pandemic.

"Bounce", became a major hit song from Pandemic EP, and debuted at number 39 on the Top 50 chart Nigeria, and was listed at number 20 on the TurnTable End of the Year chart and number 2 on the Apple Music top Afrobeats songs. On 26 November 2021, he released his second EP, titled The Second Wave, with "Dior" as the lead single, which debuted number 32 on the Top 50 chart, and number 15 on the UK Afrobeats Singles Chart. The song later peaked at number one in Nigeria, Gambia, Kenya, Uganda, Sierra Leone, and Madagascar. 

Ruger  described his music as Afrodancehall (a fusion of Afrobeats with dancehall elements).

Early life 
Michael Adebayo Olayinka was born on 23 September 1999 in Lagos, where he was also raised. He is originally from Ijumu Local Government Area of Kogi State, Nigeria and is the only son of his family.

Career 
Ruger started music at a young age, and was a member of his school music band as a teenager and also a member of his church choir. He began composing songs and perform at shows and school functions. After he was discovered by D'Prince, he was named "Ruger" by D'Prince himself. Ruger's first song recorded seventy million views in three days. In January 2021, D’Prince announced the signing of Ruger to Jonzing World and Sony Music Entertainment UK, in a joint venture with Columbia Records.

He was introduced to the public by D'Prince, following the release of "One Shirt", with Rema. On 19 February 2021, he released Ruger, a self-titled single off his first EP project, titled PANDEMIC. Pandemic was certified Platinum in Sub-Saharan Africa. He achieved mainstream recognition with the release of his debut extended play and its hit track "Bounce", which became his major hit, with over 52 million views on Youtube. It  reached number one on Apple Music in Nigeria, and other African countries.   On 19 November 2021, he released his second extended play titled The Second Wave, solely produced by Kukbeatz, which was led by "Dior" from the EP, becoming the first to peak number 1 song in Nigeria 2022, alongside Gambia, Kenya, Uganda, Sierra Leone, Madagascar and other African countries. "Dior" also peaked number 32 on the Top 50 chart, and number 15 on the UK Afrobeats Singles Chart. 2021 AFRIMMA (African Muzik Magazine Awards) nominated RUGER for Best NewComer 2021  2021 AFRIMA (All Africa Music Awards) nominated Ruger for  Best Artiste, Duo or Group in African Reggae, Ragga or Dancehall and Most Promising African Artiste of the year. AEAUSA (African Entertainment Awards USA) nominated Ruger for Best New Artist and Best Reggae or Dancehall Act of the year award. In August 2021 Ruger signed a massive Entertainment Residency Endorsement Deal with Eko Hotel. RUGER was listed among the 22 Musicians Set To Rule 2022 by Vogue Magazine UK.

On March 2022 Ruger was unveiled as brand ambassador for Tiger Beer. On 17 June 2022, he released a deluxe to his commercially successful EP "The Second Wave", adding three new songs to the project (Girlfriend, WeWe and Warning). "Girlfriend" turned out to be a massive hit topping charts in several countries, and later becoming his most successful song with almost 200 million streams on all digital streaming platforms. After a short break from the music scene, Ruger made a big come back on November of the same year with two songs "Red Flags" and "Asiwaju". "Asiwaju" proved to be the better song charting at number 1 on Apple Music Nigeria for almost 2 months. The song also topped charts in 7 other countries while also peaking at number 3 on the UK Afrobeats Singles Chart and number 16 on the US Afrobeats Chart. After the release of the 2 songs Ruger also announced that he would be dropping his highly anticipated debut Album in the first quarter of 2023.

On February 2023, Ruger was named Best New Artiste at the Soundcity MVP Awards which were held at the Eko Convention Centre in Lagos.

Discography

EPs

Singles

As featured artist

SINGLES

"Ruger" (2021)

"Abu Dhabi" (2021)

"Bow" (2021)

"Bounce" (2021)

"Monalisa" (2021)

"Yekpa" (2021)

"Dior" (2021)

"Champion" (2021)

"Snapchat" (2021)

"Useless" (2021)

"Girlfriend" (2022)

"WeWe" (2022)

"Warning"  (2022)

"Red Flags" (2022)

"Asiwaju" (2022)
Other charted songs

Awards and nominations

Notes

References 

Living people
1999 births
21st-century Nigerian male singers
Musicians from Lagos